Dormaa Central is one of the constituencies represented in the Parliament of Ghana. It elects one Member of Parliament (MP) by the first past the post system of election. Dormaa Central is located in the Dormaa Municipal District of the Bono Region  of Ghana. It was created prior to the 2012 Ghanaian general election.

Boundaries 
The seat is located within the Dormaa Municipal District of the  Bono Region of Ghana.

Members of Parliament

Elections 

 
 
 
 

Results below are prior to the creation of the Dorma Central Constituency. For the 1965 elections, there were the Dorma and the Dorma-Drobo constituencies. For the 1969 and 1979 elections, there was a single Dorma constituency. Between 1992 and 2008 elections, there was the Dorma West and Dorma East constituencies. The Dorma Central constituency was created before the 2012 elections.

See also 
 List of Ghana Parliament constituencies
 List of political parties in Ghana

References 

Parliamentary constituencies in the Bono Region